Chad Carlyle Erickson (born August 21, 1970) is an American former professional ice hockey goaltender who played two games in the National Hockey League, both for the New Jersey Devils in 1991–92. He won one game, lost the other and had a 4.50 goals against average. He never returned to the NHL, but played for numerous minor league teams between 1991 and 2000. He was a Western Collegiate Hockey Association Second-Team All-Star and National Collegiate Athletic Association West First All-American team selection in 1990 while playing for the University of Minnesota-Duluth.

Career statistics

Regular season and playoffs

Awards and honours

References

External links
 

1970 births
Living people
Albany River Rats players
American men's ice hockey goaltenders
Austin Ice Bats players
Birmingham Bulls (ECHL) players
Cincinnati Cyclones (IHL) players
Ice hockey people from Minneapolis
Minnesota Duluth Bulldogs men's ice hockey players
New Jersey Devils draft picks
New Jersey Devils players
Providence Bruins players
Raleigh IceCaps players
San Angelo Outlaws players
Springfield Falcons players
Tulsa Oilers (1992–present) players
Utica Devils players
AHCA Division I men's ice hockey All-Americans